"Here with Me" is the debut single of English singer-songwriter Dido. It was the first single she released from her 1999 debut studio album, No Angel. The song was written about her then-boyfriend Bob Page. The single was released on 17 May 1999 in the United States but was not released in the United Kingdom until February 2001, serving as Dido's debut single in her home country. In other territories, it was issued as the album's second single, following "Thank You". Shortly after its release, "Here with Me" was used as the theme song for the American science fiction television programme Roswell (1999–2002).

"Here with Me" peaked at number four on the UK Singles Chart, becoming Dido's second consecutive top-five single, following "Stan", a collaboration with Eminem that incorporated, in sample form, the first verse of "Thank You". The single also became a top-five hit in France, Hungary, New Zealand, and Portugal, and it peaked at number 16 on the US Billboard Bubbling Under Hot 100 chart in October 2000. In Australia, the track reached number one on the ARIA Hitseekers Chart following Dido's live performance at the 2001 ARIA Awards.

Music videos
Two distinct music videos were produced for the selection. The first version was filmed in 1999, and released to the American market. The American version was directed by Big TV! and uses footage of the singer rendered in sepia tones. Dido later stated that she hoped to record a new video of the selection for international release.

The second version, shot in full color and directed by Liz Friedlander, was released in May 2000. This became the video released to the British & European markets; the music video for the international version was filmed in downtown Toronto, Ontario, Canada.

Synopsis
The synopsis for the second version of the video begins with Dido wearing all blue clothing shooting a scene in all blue coloured bedroom set. After finishing filming she cleans herself up and takes a long walk on the streets in Downtown, Toronto. After stopping at a coffee shop to buy herself some coffee Dido immediately drops it and continues walking the streets alone thus dropping her coat in the process.

The video ends with Dido letting herself in at an apartment, where she finds a man asleep and then lies next to him in his bed before the shot zooms out to reveal itself to be a photograph with Dido back in her blue clothes and bedroom set again holding it, then turns it over and pushes it against her chest.

Track listings

UK, Australian, and New Zealand CD single
 "Here with Me" (radio edit) – 4:05
 "Here with Me" (Lukas Burton mix) – 3:55
 "Here with Me" (Chillin' with the Family mix) – 5:16
 "Here with Me" (Parks & Wilson Homeyard dub) – 6:02

UK cassette single and European CD single
 "Here with Me" (radio edit) – 4:05
 "Here with Me" (Lukas Burton mix) – 3:55

US DVD single
 "Here with Me" (video)
 "Thank You" (live)
 Photo gallery

Japanese maxi-CD single
 "Here with Me" (radio edit)
 "Here with Me" (Lukas Burton mix)
 "Here with Me" (Chillin' with the Family mix)
 "Here with Me" (Parks & Wilson Homeyard dub)
 "Thank You" (Deep Dish dub)

Credits and personnel
Credits are lifted from the UK CD single liner notes and the No Angel album booklet.

Studios
 Recorded and mixed at Swanyard Studios (London, England)
 Mastered at Sterling Sound (New York City)

Personnel

 Dido – writing (as Dido Armstrong), all vocals, production
 Paul Statham – writing, keyboards, initial pre-production and programming
 Pascal Gabriel – writing, initial pre-production and programming
 Rick Nowels – acoustic guitar, keyboards, production
 John Themis – electric guitar, percussion
 Peter-John Vettese – additional keyboards and programming
 Wil Malone – string arrangement
 Gavyn Wright – string leader
 James Sanger – programming
 Ash Howes – recording, mixing
 Tom Coyne – mastering
 Richard Andrews – artwork design
 Simon Emmett – photography

Charts and certifications

Weekly charts

Year-end charts

Certifications

Release history

In popular culture

 "Here with Me" was featured as the opening song of the TV series Roswell. A cover was featured in the final scene of the first season of the rebooted series Roswell, New Mexico.
 The song was prominently featured in the 2003 romantic comedy Love Actually during a scene where one of the characters has finally, but unintentionally, revealed his love for his best friend's new wife by filming her secretly. The track appears on the movie's soundtrack album.
 "Here with Me" was also used in the 2000 film Bounce.
 "Here with Me" was also featured in the NBC television show ER, when it was played as Samantha Taggart went over to Luka Kovač's apartment to have sexual intercourse.
 "Here with Me" has been used as the haunting music featured in Victorian WorkSafe campaign advertisements, advocating safer workplaces for the sake of families.
 In December 2010, Matt Cardle performed "Here with Me" in the final of the talent show The X Factor.

References

1999 debut singles
1999 songs
2001 singles
Arista Records singles
Bertelsmann Music Group singles
Cheeky Records singles
Dido (singer) songs
Music videos directed by Big T.V.
Music videos directed by Liz Friedlander
Song recordings produced by Dido (singer)
Song recordings produced by Rick Nowels
Songs about heartache
Songs written by Dido (singer)
Songs written by Pascal Gabriel
Songs written by Paul Statham
Television drama theme songs